Tamara Lee Story (born February 24, 1959) is an American politician. She serves as a member of the Colorado House of Representatives, representing District 25. Previously, she served as a member of the Colorado Senate, representing the 16th district in Jefferson County.

Political career

Elections
Story was first elected to the state senate in the general election on November 6, 2018, winning 55 percent of the vote over 42 percent of Republican incumbent Tim Neville. Story ran for State House district 25 in the 2022 election. Story defeated incumbent Colin Larson in the election, who had represented the 22nd district prior to redistricting.

References

Democratic Party members of the Colorado House of Representatives
Democratic Party Colorado state senators
Living people
21st-century American politicians
21st-century American women politicians
Women state legislators in Colorado
1959 births